Nina Herelová (born 30 July 1993) is a Slovak female volleyball player. She is part of the Slovakia women's national volleyball team. She competed at the 2019 Women's European Volleyball Championship.

Clubs
  VK Prievidza (2005–2008)
  COP Nitra (2008–2010)
  Slávia UK Bratislava (2010–2013)
  SVS Post Schwechat (2013–2015)
  VK Prostějov (2015–2018)
  BKS Bielsko-Biała (2018–2019)
  Vandeuvre Nancy Volley-Ball (2019–present)

References

External links

 Profile on FIVB
 Profile on CEV
 Official site of club

1993 births
Living people
Slovak women's volleyball players
Sportspeople from Bojnice